Donald Alan Brinkley (March 9, 1921 – July 14, 2012) was an American television writer, director and producer. He wrote for countless television shows in a career that spanned over 55 years, and wrote and produced the shows Medical Center and Trapper John M.D. He also wrote a play and a novel, "A Lively Form of Death". Brinkley was honored by the Museum of Broadcasting both in Los Angeles and New York City for his career.

Career

After World War II Brinkley worked in Chicago as a staff writer at WGN Radio and as a Chief Writer at CBS Radio.

In 1950 he moved to Southern California where he began an illustrious career as a television scenarist, writing over 400 teleplays for such shows as The Untouchables, The Fugitive, Have Gun, Will Travel, Kraft Suspense Theatre, The F.B.I., The Virginian, Ben Casey, Bat Masterson, The Man From U.N.C.L.E., Rawhide, Ironside, The Name of the Game and many others.

After serving as producer on the Executive Suite series, Brinkley wrote and produced a number of television pilots, one of which was Trapper John, M.D.. The series ran for seven years on CBS, accumulating high ratings and numerous awards for its unique explorations of such controversial issues as gay rights, women's rights, euthanasia, nuclear disarmament, the right to die, and animal research.  As one of the first series on prime time to deal with the AIDS problem, Trapper John, M.D. was awarded a citation of excellence by the city of Los Angeles.  With Brinkley as executive producer, the show was also lauded for employing female writers and directors and for hiring disabled actors.

Don and Frank Glicksman, his co-creator and partner on Trapper John, M.D. also teamed up for the highly successful series, Medical Center, which Brinkley produced.  Over the series' seven-year span, he also wrote 45 original episodes.  One of them was directly responsible for strengthening the California laws regarding discrimination against cancer patients.  Because of its social and political impact, that particular episode was cited by the California Legislature and awarded a certificate of merit by the American Cancer Society.  Another of Brinkley's Medical Center scripts was chosen "Best Dramatic Television Show" at the Monte Carlo Film Festival.

In 1996 he published a thriller novel called "A Lively Form of Death".  In 1998 he wrote "Prisoner of Justice (The Trials of Doctor Mudd)", a drama in two acts.

In July 1988 the Museum of Broadcasting in New York set aside two nights to honor Don Brinkley with a retrospective of his career in television.  In his speech to the Museum's audience, Don stated that after almost fifty years as a writer/producer, "I've already become what I'm going to be".

Early life

Don Brinkley knew what he was going to be when he was in his teens, growing up in New York City.  While still in High School and in his collegiate years at Hofstra University, he began writing and selling radio scripts to the major networks.  During World War II he served as a medic in the US Army.

Family
Don married Marjorie M. Bowling and legally adopted her children, Christie and Gregory. They refer to him as their "father" and not "step-father."  The day after Don died, Marjorie had a stroke and heart attack, dying only seven weeks later on September 9.  Christie said her mother died of a broken heart after fifty-five years of a happy marriage.

Filmography

Films

Television

References

External links
 
 
 Donald Brinkley collection, 1946-1987, held by the Billy Rose Theatre Collection, New York Public Library for the Performing Arts.

1921 births
2012 deaths
American television directors
Television producers from New York City
American television writers
Hofstra University alumni
American male television writers
People from the Bronx
People from Sag Harbor, New York
Screenwriters from New York (state)